Elaeodendron is a genus of flowering plants in the staff vine family, Celastraceae.

Selected species
 Elaeodendron australe Vent.
 Elaeodendron croceum (Thunb.) DC.
 Elaeodendron curtipendulum Endl.
 Elaeodendron glaucum (Rottb.) Pers.
 Elaeodendron melanocarpum F.Muell.
 Elaeodendron orientale J.Jacq.
 Elaeodendron transvaalense (Burtt Davy) R.H.Archer
 Elaeodendron xylocarpum (Vent.) DC.
 Elaeodendron zeyheri Spreng. ex Turcz.

Formerly placed in Elaeodendron
 Cassine laneana (A.H.Moore) J.Ingram (as E. laneanum)
 Euonymus fortunei (Turcz.) Hand.-Mazz. (as E. fortunei Turcz.)
 Flindersia maculosa (Lindl.) F.Muell. (as E. maculosum Lindl.)
 Maytenus quadrangulata (Schrad.) Loes. (as E. quadrangulatum (Schrad.) Reissek)

References

External links

 
Celastrales genera